Shell Shock, also known as 82nd Marines Attack, is a 1964 film B-movie directed and co-written by  John Hayes and produced by and starring Beach Dickerson.  The film takes place in Italy during World War II, and tells the story of a sergeant with his group of soldiers.

Plot

Cast
Beach Dickerson as Rance
 Carl Crow as Johnny Wade
 Frank Leo as Gil Evans
 Pamela Grey as Maria
 William Guhl as Wrigley
 Max Huber as Major
Dolores Faith as American girl

External links

1964 films
1964 drama films
Italian Campaign of World War II films
American war drama films
1960s English-language films
Films directed by John Hayes
1960s American films